Meleonoma diehlella is a moth in the family Cosmopterigidae. It is found in Madagascar.

References

Natural History Museum Lepidoptera generic names catalog

Cosmopterigidae